A loaded question is a form of  complex question that contains a controversial assumption (e.g., a presumption of guilt).

Such questions may be used as a rhetorical tool: the question attempts to limit direct replies to be those that serve the questioner's agenda. The traditional example is the question "Have you stopped beating your wife?" Whether the respondent answers yes or no, they will admit to having a wife and having beaten her at some time in the past. Thus, these facts are presupposed by the question, and in this case an entrapment, because it narrows the respondent to a single answer, and the fallacy of many questions has been committed. The fallacy relies upon context for its effect: the fact that a question presupposes something does not in itself make the question fallacious. Only when some of these presuppositions are not necessarily agreed to by the person who is asked the question does the argument containing them become fallacious. Hence, the same question may be loaded in one context, but not in the other. For example, the previous question would not be loaded if it were asked during a trial in which the defendant had already admitted to beating his wife.

This informal fallacy should be distinguished from that of begging the question, which offers a premise whose plausibility depends on the truth of the proposition asked about, and which is often an implicit restatement of the proposition.

Defense
A common way out of this argument is not to answer the question (e.g. with a simple 'yes' or 'no'), but to challenge the assumption behind the question. To use an earlier example, a good response to the question "Have you stopped beating your wife?" would be "I have never beaten my wife". This removes the ambiguity of the expected response, therefore nullifying the tactic. However, the asker is likely to respond by accusing the one who answers of dodging the question.

An alternative manner of answering involves the Buddhist word mu, meaning "Neither yes nor no". This was illustrated in a story titled "Looking for Kelly Dahl": 

 "Mu," said Kelly Dahl.
 On one level mu means only yes, but on a deeper level of Zen it was often used by the master when the acolyte asked a stupid, unanswerable or wrongheaded question such as "Does a dog have the Buddha-nature?" The Master would answer only, "Mu," meaning—I say "yes" but mean "no," but the actual answer is: Unask the question.

Historical examples
Diogenes Laërtius wrote a brief biography of the philosopher Menedemus in which he relates that: 

For another example, the 2009 referendum on corporal punishment in New Zealand asked: "Should a smack as part of good parental correction be a criminal offence in New Zealand?" Murray Edridge, of Barnardos New Zealand, criticized the question as "loaded and ambiguous" and claimed "the question presupposes that smacking is a part of good parental correction".

See also

 Barber paradox
 Complex question
 Entailment (pragmatics)
 False dilemma
 Gotcha journalism
 Implicature
 Leading question
 Mu (negative)
 Presupposition
 Suggestive question
 List of fallacies

References

External links
 Fallacy: Loaded Questions and Complex Claims Critical Thinking exercises. San Jose State University.
 Logical Fallacy: Loaded Question The Fallacy Files
What Is The Loaded Question Fallacy? Definition and Examples Fallacy in Logic

Informal fallacies